Robert Moses (1888–1981) was an American city planner.

Robert Moses may also refer to:
 Bob Moses (activist) (1935–2021), American educator and civil rights activist
 Bob Moses, American football player in the 1962 Cotton Bowl Classic
 Bob Moses (musician) (born 1948), American jazz drummer and educator
 Bob Moses (band), a musical duo from Vancouver, Canada
 Bob Moses (rugby league) (1940–2017), Australian rugby league footballer

See also
Robert Mose, MP
Robert Moses Causeway, Long Island, New York, United States
Robert Moses Niagara Power Plant, hydroelectricity power plant
Robert Moses State Park (disambiguation)
Robert Moses State Parkway, near Niagara Falls, New York, United States
Moses-Saunders Power Dam, between Massena, New York and Cornwall, Ontario, on the St. Lawrence River